Life in the Bubble is an album by Gordon Goodwin's Big Phat Band that won the Grammy Award for Best Large Jazz Ensemble Album in 2015. Goodwin won an additional Grammy Award for Best Instrumental Arrangement for his version of the song "On Green Dolphin Street".

Track listing

Personnel

 Gordon Goodwin – tenor saxophone, piano
 Eric Marienthal – soprano saxophone, alto saxophone
 Kevin Garren – alto saxophone, tenor saxophone
 Sal Lozano – alto saxophone, flute, piccolo
 Jeff Driskill – tenor saxophone
 Brian Scanlon – tenor saxophone, clarinet
 Jay Mason – baritone saxophone, bass clarinet
 Charlie Morillas – trombone
 Craig Gosnell – trombone
 Andy Martin – trombone
 Francisco Torres – trombone
 Wayne Bergeron – trumpet
 Dan Fornero – trumpet
 Willie Murillo – trumpet
 Dan Savant – trumpet
 Bob Summers – trumpet
 Rick Shaw – double bass, bass guitar
 Andrew Synowiec – guitar
 Bernie Dresel – drums
 Joey De Leon, Jr. – percussion
 Judith Hill – vocals

Production

 Gordon Goodwin – executive producer, liner notes
 John Burk – executive producer
 Dan Savant – producer
 Gregg Field – producer, engineer, mixing
 Tommy Vicari – engineer, mixing
 Michael Aarvold – engineer
 Charlie Paakkari – engineer
 Paul Blakemore – mastering

References

	  	

  		  	

2014 albums
Big band albums
Gordon Goodwin's Big Phat Band albums
Grammy Award for Best Large Jazz Ensemble Album
Telarc Records albums